When the actual benefits of a venture are less than the projected or estimated benefits, the result is known as a benefit shortfall. 

If, for instance, a company is launching a new product or service and projected sales are 40 million dollars per year, whereas actual annual sales turn out to be only 30 million dollars, then the benefit shortfall is said to be 25 percent. Sometimes the terms "demand shortfall" or "revenue shortfall" are used instead of benefit shortfall.

Public and private enterprises alike fall victim to benefit shortfalls. Prudent planning of new ventures will include the risk of benefit shortfalls in risk assessment and risk management.

The discipline of benefits realisation management seeks to identify any benefits shortfall as early as possible in a project or programmes delivery in order to allow corrective action to be taken, costs to be controlled and benefits realised.

See also 
Cost overrun
Cost-benefit analysis
Downside risk
Efficient contract theory
Hiding hand principle
Optimism bias
Planning fallacy
Reference class forecasting
Underconsumption – macroeconomic form

References 

 Cost Management: Book: Measuring, Monitoring & Motivating Performance By K. P. Gupta

Problems in business economics